Anambra West is a Local Government Area in the northwestern part of Anambra State, Nigeria. Towns that make up the local government are Mmiata Anam, Umuoba-Abegbu Anam, Umuenwelum Anam, Owelle,  Oroma-Etiti, Umueze Anam, Umudora Anam, Umuikwu Anam, Onono Umuikwu Anam, Ukwalla, Inoma-Akator, Nzam, Igbedor, Igbokenyi, Odekpe, Allah/Onugwa and Iyiora Anam. The headquarters and the seat of government is Nzam.
The people of Anambra West belong to an Igbo subgroup known as Omambala.

Natural resources
Anambra West is rich in crude oil and natural gas, and is rated as having the highest oil reserves in Nigeria with large amounts of untapped natural gas and oil at Mmiata Anam, Owelle, Umuikwu, Umudora, Nzam, Odekpe,Allah/Onugwa and Igbedor.Anambra west is the foods basket of anambra state and until date they are lacking of all sort of social amenities 
most of this towns went to the stream,spring and river to fetch water to drink

Schools
Here is the list of secondary schools in Anambra West Local Government Area:
 Community Secondary School, Umueze Anam
 Anam High School, Oroma-Etiti
 Christ The King College, Umuem Anam
 Community Secondary School, Mmiata Anam
 Community Comprehensive Secondary School, Nzam
 Udama Community Secondary School, Inoma-Akator
 Community Secondary School, Igbedor
 Great Sailor Int'l Secondary School, Onono-Umuikwu, Anam
Crowther memorial College, Umuikwu Anam
 Madonna Secondary School, Nzam

References

 Anam Community - Polley Keyz Online

External links
 Local Government Areas in Anambra State

Local Government Areas in Anambra State
Local Government Areas in Igboland